Listed below are the dates and results for the 2006 FIFA World Cup qualification rounds for Oceania. 12 teams took part, competing for a place in the intercontinental play-off against the fifth-placed team from South America. The winner of this play-off qualified for the World Cup.

This qualifying tournament also doubled as the 2004 OFC Nations Cup, up to the final play-off stage.

First round 

The competition was composed of three rounds. Australia and New Zealand entered the competition directly in the Second Round. The other 10 teams were divided in two groups of five teams each, and played against each other once. The two teams with most points in each group advanced to the Second Round.

Group 1
All matches were held in Honiara, Solomon Islands (UTC+11)

 Group 2 All games are held in Apia, Samoa Second round 

In the Second round, the six teams were put in a single group, and played against each other once. The two teams with most points advanced to a play-off, and played against each other home and away. The winner of this play-off advanced to the intercontinental play-off.

 Group stage 

 Final 

Australia and the Solomon Islands progressed to the final stage.

 Final round Australia won 9–1 on aggregate and advanced to the CONMEBOL–OFC play-off against Uruguay.''

Inter-confederation play-offs

The final round winners then played the fifth-placed team of CONMEBOL qualifying, Uruguay, in a home-and-away play-off. The winner of this play-off qualified for the 2006 FIFA World Cup finals.

Qualified teams
The following team from OFC qualified for the final tournament.

1 Bold indicates champions for that year. Italic indicates hosts for that year.

Goalscorers
There were 164 goals scored in 39 matches (including 2 international play-offs), for an average of 4.21 goals per match.
7 goals

 Tim Cahill
 Veresa Toma

6 goals

 Michel Hmae
 Vaughan Coveny
 Reginald Davani

5 goals

 Henry Fa'arodo

4 goals

 Brett Emerton
 Laisiasa Gataurua
 Seveci Rokotakala
 Brent Fisher
 Andrew Lepani
 Commins Menapi
 Jean Maleb
 Etienne Mermer

3 goals

 Mile Sterjovski
 Waisake Sabutu
 Paul Poatinda
 Pierre Wajoka
 Alick Maemae
 Batram Suri
 Axel Temataua
 Seimata Chilia
 Alphonse Qorig

2 goals

 John Aloisi
 Mark Bresciano
 Scott Chipperfield
 Adrian Madaschi
 Archie Thompson
 Mark Viduka
 Esala Masinisau
 José Hmae
 Ryan Nelsen
 Duncan Oughton
 Paul Komboi
 Mauri Wasi
 Tama Fasavalu
 Junior Michael
 Gideon Omokirio
 Jack Samani
 Gabriel Wajoka

1 goal

 Natia Natia
 Jason Culina
 Ahmad Elrich
 Josip Skoko
 David Zdrilic
 John Pareanga
 Pita Rabo
 Thomas Vulivuli
 Ramon Djamali
 Robert Kaumé
 Che Bunce
 Neil Jones
 Aaran Lines
 Eric Komeng
 Nathaniel Lepani
 Michael Lohai
 Dennis Bryce
 Mahlon Houkarawa
 Paul Kakai
 Leo Leslie
 George Suri
 Stanley Waita
 Rino Moretta
 Vincent Simon
 Mark Uhatahi
 Viliami Vaitaki
 Lexa Bibi
 Richard Iwai
 Simon Lauru
 Moise Poida
 Lorry Thomsen

1 own goal

 Vincent Simon (playing against Australia)

References

 
OFC
FIFA World Cup qualification (OFC)
World